FC Zakarpattia-2 Uzhhorod was a Ukrainian football team based in Uzhhorod, Ukraine. The club had been featured regularly in the Ukrainian Second Division and served as a junior team for the FC Zakarpattia Uzhhorod franchise. Like most tributary teams, the best players are sent up to the senior team, meanwhile developing other players for further call-ups.

Zakarpattia-2 Uzhhorod
Zakarpattia-2 Uzhhorod
Association football clubs established in 2001
Association football clubs disestablished in 2003
2001 establishments in Ukraine
2003 disestablishments in Ukraine